Kyra Panagia is a Greek island in the Sporades. It is administratively part of the municipality of Alonnisos in the Sporades regional unit. The island is also known by the name of Pelagos and rarely Pelagonisi. . A bay in the south west of the island is named Agios Petros. Kyra Panagia has belonged to the Athonite monastery of Megisti Lavra since it was granted the island by the Byzantine emperor Nikephoros II Phokas in 963. There is a monastery renovated in 2017 after 8 years of work and inhabited by a single monk, on the east coast of the island. , the resident population of the island was 2. Kyra Panagia is in Zone B of the Alonnisos Marine Park.

Nearest islands and islets
Its nearest islands and islets are Gioura to the northeast and the main island of Alonnisos to the southwest.

References

External links
Kyra Panagia (Pelagos) on GTP Travel Pages 
Official website of Municipality of Aloníssos 

Landforms of the Sporades
Islands of Thessaly